The Taigei-class submarines (29SS)  is a new class of attack submarines developed for the Japan Maritime Self-Defense Force. The Taigei class is equipped with a large amount of lithium-ion batteries, as is the case with the eleventh and twelfth submarines of the Sōryū class ( and ), making it possible for the submersible to travel longer and at higher speeds under water than conventional diesel-electric submarines.

Development 
The development of the Taigei class was conducted from a variety of researches aimed at developing new and improved submarine components to improve the capabilities of "next-generation submarines" that will operate in the 2020s and beyond.

Early studies (2004)
In 2004, an evaluation was made on researching next-generation submarine systems based on capability requirements: dive speed, stealth, etc. The research involved utilizing simulation technologies to optimize the most efficient design for the submarine and analyze its cost-effectiveness. The technical data obtained would be used to aid in the design and construction of the new submarine class. The project reflected that the submarines would be introduced in the 2020s and that the research is conducted between 2005 and 2008, while in-house testing occurs between 2007 and 2009. A total of ¥800 million were used to fund project.

In 2005, evaluations for next-generation submarine sonar and air-independent propulsion (AIP) system were initiated. The first project aimed to develop a new sonar array with improvements in weight reduction, power saving and detection ability in response to improved quietness of future ships and submarines. The second projects aimed to develop new AIP system to extend underwater sustainability for future submarines. The new sonars were to be introduced to next generation submarines operating from 2020s onward. Likewise, the new AIP systems will allow the submarines to expand their operational areas, including responding in shallow waters. Research on both components were carried out between 2006 and 2008 and tested between 2008 and 2009. A total of ¥1.5 billion and ¥2.5 billion yen were allocated for the sonar and AIP system projects.

Future equipment evaluation (2006)
In 2006, an evaluation for anti-detection/shock resistance submarine structure was conducted. The project involved researching propeller and hull shape design to reduce noise generation and submarine structure to improve noise reduction and impact resistance. The research called for the next-generation submarine make use of floating floor structure; the floorboards are attached to the inner shell through buffer mechanism to prevent vibration inside to submarine from getting out and protect against shock from outside the submarine. A prototype was developed between 2007 and 2011 and tested between 2010 and 2014. A total of ¥400 million were used to fund the project.

Power systems (2009)
In 2009, researches on snorkel power generation system and sonar system were evaluated. The new snorkel power generation system aimed to be more compact, quiet and generate higher power output to enhance the submarines operability, survivability and stealth. Comparable alternative power generation systems that were examined include the MTU 16V396SE diesel engines used on the Type 212 submarine and SEMT Pielstick PA4V200SM diesel engine. However, both engines were deemed to output below required performance and thus the development of a new power generation system was initiated. The sonar system was developed to improve detection and information processing capabilities for next-generation submarines to improve its combat capabilities and operability in shallow waters. The snorkel power generation prototype was developed between 2010 and 2014 and tested between 2014 and 2015. The prototype for the sonar system was developed between 2010 and 2013 and tested between 2013 and 2014. A total of ¥1.3 billion were allocated to fund the snorkel power generation system project and ¥4.9 billion for the sonar system.

Structure and hull (2012)
In 2012, research on the structural mode for submarines was conducted. Typically when adding new equipment onto an existing submarine design the solution to integrate it is to extend the compartment length of the submarine; which in turn increases the size, reinforcing of materials and price. The purpose of the research is to reduce future submarine size and price by optimizing the structural mode of the pressure shell of a submarine and obtain technical data to develop future submarine design. A research prototype was developed between 2013 and 2015 and in-house testing were conducted between 2014 and 2015. A total of ¥1.1 billion were used to fund the research.

In 2016, proposed research on new hull design to reduce fluid noise and a new sonar system to cope with the quietness of future foreign ships and submarines were evaluated. The research into the reduction of fluid noise will implement technologies to reduce interference noise from the hull and propeller and reduce low frequency noise components caused by the interference generated between the flow around the hull and the propeller. The evaluation into the new sonar system expects that foreign surface ships and submarines operating in the 2030s will improve their quietness and operate in complex and diverse marine environments; thus improvements in detection and tracking capabilities were researched. The first research was commenced between 2017 and 2020, while testing occurs between 2019 and 2022. Development of a new sonar system is researched between 2017 and 2020, followed by immediate testing in 2020. A total of ¥1.2 billion were used to research the new hull design, while ¥5.1 billion were used to research the sonar system.

Silent drive and power storage (2017)
In 2017, research on a silent drive system was evaluated. The silent drive system is used to further reduce the noise emitted from the submarine in response to improvements made in sonar technology by other countries. Research was conducted between 2018 and 2021 and will be tested between 2021 and 2022. A total of ¥5.7 billion were allocated for this project.

In 2018, an evaluation on a high-efficiency power storage and supply system was conducted. The project aimed to improve the efficiency and energy of the power storage and supply system by achieving high efficiency and miniaturization in the power supply system and increasing the capacity and density of the power storage system. Prototyping occurs between 2019 and 2022 and in-house testing to simulate the installation on a submarine occurs in 2023. A total of ¥4.4 billion are used in its development.

Design 
The hull design of the Taigei class is said to not differ too much from the Sōryū class but will be 100 tons heavier than its predecessor. However, the Taigei-class submarines will be more advanced as they are equipped with newer equipment such as sonar systems, snorkel power generation system. The Taigei class will use lithium-ion batteries much like the JS Ōryū and JS Tōryū submarines. The submarines use the Type 18 torpedo (ja), a successor to the Type 89 torpedo.

Operational use
The first submarine of this class, Taigei, will be converted to a test submarine. The reason for the change is due to the need to acquire a dedicated test submarine instead of pulling an ordinary submarine from its operations to conduct tests. By doing so, the JMSDF can increase operating days and strengthen monitoring activities with their attack submarines while the test submarine will accelerate research and development.

Boats

See also
Submarines of similar type
 Blekinge-class submarine is a class of submarine developed by Kockums for the Swedish Navy
 : A unique class of  diesel-electric attack-submarines developed by ThyssenKrupp Marine Systems and currently being built for Israel.
 : A class of extensively-customised diesel-electric attack-submarines developed by ThyssenKrupp Marine Systems and currently operated by Israel.
 KSS-III submarine: A class of diesel-electric attack submarines, built by Daewoo Shipbuilding & Marine Engineering and Hyundai Heavy Industries and operated by the Republic of Korea Navy.
 : A class of diesel-electric attack-submarines being built for the Russian Navy.
 S-80 Plus submarine: A class of conventionally-powered attack-submarines, currently being built by Navantia for the Spanish Navy.
 : A class of export-oriented diesel-electric attack-submarines, jointly developed by Naval Group and Navantia and currently operated by the Chilean Navy, the Royal Malaysian Navy, the Indian Navy and the Brazilian Navy.* : A class of diesel-electric attack-submarines, built by Mitsubishi Heavy Industries for the Japan Maritime Self-Defense Force.
 Type 039A submarine: A class of diesel-electric attack-submarines operated by the People's Liberation Army Navy (China) and being built for the navies of the Royal Thai Navy and the Pakistan Navy.
 Type 212 submarine: A class of diesel-electric attack-submarines developed by ThyssenKrupp Marine Systems and exclusively built for the German Navy, the Italian Navy and the Royal Norwegian Navy.
 Type 214 submarine: A class of export-oriented diesel-electric attack-submarines, also developed by ThyssenKrupp Marine Systems and currently operated by the Hellenic Navy, the Portuguese Navy, the Republic of Korea Navy and the Turkish Naval Forces.
 Type 218SG submarine: A class of extensively-customised diesel-electric attack-submarines developed ThyssenKrupp Marine Systems and currently operated by the Republic of Singapore Navy.

References

External links

Attack submarines
Submarine classes
Ships built by Mitsubishi Heavy Industries
 
Mitsubishi Heavy Industries submarines
Ships built by Kawasaki Heavy Industries